CFS is an acronym for:

Organizations
 Canadian Federation of Students
 Canadian Forest Service
 Center for Financial Studies, a research institute affiliated with Goethe University Frankfurt
 Center for Subjectivity Research, a research institute affiliated with the University of Copenhagen
 Child and family services
 Christian Family Solutions, a Christian non-profit social service agency headquartered in Germantown, Wisconsin
 Citizens for Sunshine, an Ohio nonprofit promoting access to public records
 Committee on World Food Security
 Commonwealth Fusion Systems, an American fusion energy company
 Conservative Future Scotland, the youth branch of the Scottish Conservative Party
 Co-operative Financial Services Ltd.
 Corpo Forestale dello Stato, the Italian state forestry department
 South Australian Country Fire Service, a volunteer firefighting service
 Craigmillar Festival Society, a disestablished community organisation from Edinburgh, Scotland
 Craniofacial Society of Great Britain and Ireland
 Centre for Food Safety

 Central Flying Schools:
 Central Flying School, a Royal Air Force training establishment
 Central Flying School RAAF, a Royal Australian Air Force training establishment
 Central Flying School RNZAF, a Royal New Zealand Air Force unit
 Central Flying School SAAF, a flight school of the South African Air Force

Places
 Canadian Forces Station
 Charlottesville Fashion Square, an enclosed shopping mall in the Charlottesville, Virginia area
 Congo Free State, a recognized national entity in central Africa 1885–1908
 Côte française des Somalis, the French Somaliland

Transportation
 Citywide Ferry Service, a commuter ferry in New York City
 Coffs Harbour Airport, IATA airport code
 Empire Airlines, originally named Clearwater Flying Service; thus the CFS identifier for its flights
 Syrian Railways (Chemins de Fer Syriens, CFS), the Syrian state railway system

Science and technology
 Canada Flight Supplement
 Causal fermion systems
 Safety training certificate (France) (Flight attendant), Certificat de formation à la sécurité, the French national degree required to be flight attendant in France
 Chromosomal fragile site, a part of the chromosome prone to breakage. 
 Chronic fatigue syndrome, medical disorder
 Climate Forecast System, a NCEP short-term climate model which is also known as the Coupled Forecast System
 Cold formed steel, a goods manufacturing technique
 Microsoft Combat Flight Simulator (CFS1)
 CFS (file format), an open file format for archiving and compressing files.
 Completely Fair Scheduler, a Linux operating system scheduler
 Continuous flash suppression, adapted version of flash suppression
 Continuous Flow System, printer ink feeding via tubes and bottles
 Cryptographic file system, file-based cryptographic published by Matt Blaze in 1993

Other uses
 Call for service
 Chicken fried steak or country fried steak
 Consideration of future consequences
 Consolidated financial statement
 Cubic feet per second, a unit of fluid flow rate
 Certified Finance Specialist, a professional certification

sr:CSF